Pencil Mania is a 1932 animated cartoon in the Van Beuren Studios Tom and Jerry series  that breaks the fourth wall of theatre and film. The two main characters become animators in the film, and draw various cartoon scenarios against the blank background, and interact with them. The short was created by John Foster and Vernon Stallings (credited as Geo. Stallings), with synchronization by Gene Rodemich, distributed by RKO Radio Pictures and released through Library Films. The opening credits are played over the song "I'm Looking Over a Four Leaf Clover". Run time is 6:54. It is believed to be in the public domain.

References

External links
 
 

American animated short films
1932 short films
Tom and Jerry (Van Beuren)
1930s American animated films
American black-and-white films
Films directed by Vernon Stallings
1930s English-language films
Films about animation
RKO Pictures short films
RKO Pictures animated short films